Year 339 (CCCXXXIX) was a common year starting on Monday (link will display the full calendar) of the Julian calendar. At the time, it was known as the Year of the Consulship of Constantius and Claudius (or, less frequently, year 1092 Ab urbe condita). The denomination 339 for this year has been used since the early medieval period, when the Anno Domini calendar era became the prevalent method in Europe for naming years.

Events 
 By place 
 Roman Empire 
 Emperor Constantius II hastens to his territory in the East, where a revived Persia under King Shapur II is attacking Mesopotamia. For the next 11 years, the two powers engage in a war of border skirmishing, with no real victor.

 By topic 
 Religion 
 Pope Julius I gives refuge in Rome to the Alexandrian patriarch Athanasius, who is deposed and expelled during the First Synod of Tyre (see 335).
 Eusebius of Nicomedia is made bishop of Constantinople, while another Arian succeeds Athanasius as bishop of Alexandria, under the name Gregory.

Births 
 Aurelius Ambrosius, Italian bishop and theologian (d. 397)
 He Fani, Chinese empress of the Jin Dynasty (d. 404)
 Shi Shi, Chinese emperor of Later Zhao (d. 349)

Deaths 
 Abaye, Babylonian rabbi of the Jewish Talmud
 Chi Jian (or Daohui), Chinese general (b. 269)
 Duan Liao, Chinese chieftain of the Duan state (Xianbei)
 Eusebius of Caesarea, Greek bishop (approximate date) 
 Khosrov III (the Small), Roman client king (approximate date)
 Wang Dao (or Maohong), Chinese politician (b. 276)

References